The 2021 Monte-Carlo Masters (also known as the Rolex Monte-Carlo Masters for sponsorship reasons) was a tennis tournament for male professional players played on outdoor clay courts. It was the 114th edition of the annual Monte Carlo Masters tournament. It took place at the Monte Carlo Country Club in Roquebrune-Cap-Martin, France (though billed as Monte Carlo, Monaco) as a part of the Masters 1000 event on the 2021 ATP Tour.

The tournament's 2020 edition, which was scheduled for 13 – 19 April 2020, was cancelled due to the onset of the COVID-19 pandemic in France. Due to COVID-19 restrictions, there were no spectators in all stadiums during the 2021 tournament.

Champions

Singles

  Stefanos Tsitsipas def.  Andrey Rublev, 6–3, 6–3

Doubles

  Nikola Mektić /  Mate Pavić def.  Dan Evans /  Neal Skupski, 6–3, 4–6, [10–7]

Points and prize money

Points
Because the Monte Carlo Masters is the non-mandatory Masters 1000 event, special rules regarding points distribution are in place. The Monte Carlo Masters counts as one of a player's 500 level tournaments, while distributing Masters 1000 points.

Prize money 

*per team

Singles main draw entrants

Seeds

Rankings are as of 5 April 2021

Other entrants
The following players received wildcards into the main draw:
  Lucas Catarina
  Lorenzo Musetti
  Lucas Pouille
  Holger Rune

The following players received entry via the qualifying draw:
  Salvatore Caruso
  Marco Cecchinato
  Federico Delbonis
  Thomas Fabbiano
  Dominik Koepfer
  Alexei Popyrin
  Stefano Travaglia

The following players received entry as lucky losers:
  Juan Ignacio Londero
  Pedro Martínez

Withdrawals 
Before the tournament
  Borna Ćorić → replaced by  Tommy Paul
  John Isner → replaced by  Pablo Andújar
  Daniil Medvedev → replaced by  Juan Ignacio Londero
  Gaël Monfils → replaced by  Pedro Martínez
  Kei Nishikori → replaced by  Laslo Đere
  Reilly Opelka → replaced by  Jérémy Chardy
  Dominic Thiem → replaced by  Alejandro Davidovich Fokina
  Stan Wawrinka → replaced by  Jordan Thompson

Retirements
  Nikoloz Basilashvili
  Alejandro Davidovich Fokina
  Pedro Martínez

Doubles main draw entrants

Seeds

 Rankings are as of 5 April 2021.

Other entrants
The following pairs received wildcards into the doubles main draw:
  Romain Arneodo /  Hugo Nys 
  Simone Bolelli /  Jannik Sinner
  Petros Tsitsipas /  Stefanos Tsitsipas

The following pairs received entry into the doubles main draw as alternates:
  Alexander Bublik /  Dušan Lajović
  Ariel Behar /  Gonzalo Escobar

Withdrawals 
Before the tournament
  Jan-Lennard Struff /  Dominic Thiem → replaced by  Alexander Bublik /  Dušan Lajović
  Jamie Murray /  Bruno Soares → replaced by  Jamie Murray /  Jan-Lennard Struff
  Tim Pütz /  Alexander Zverev → replaced by  Ariel Behar /  Gonzalo Escobar

Retirements 
  Romain Arneodo /  Hugo Nys

References

External links
 
 Association of Tennis Professionals (ATP) tournament profile